The Hisako Higuchi Mitsubishi Electric Ladies Golf Tournament is an annual golf tournament for professional female golfers on LPGA of Japan Tour. It is usually played in October and in recent years at the Musashigaoka Golf Course, Hannō, Saitama. It was founded in 1983.

Winners 

LPGA of Japan Tour events
1983 establishments in Japan
Recurring sporting events established in 1983